Lucinda is a coastal town and locality in the Shire of Hinchinbrook, Queensland, Australia.

Geography 
The locality is bounded to the east by the Coral Sea, to the north by the southern end of the Hinchinbrook Channel (which separates Hinchinbrook Island from mainland Queensland), to the west by the Herbert River which flows in the Seaforth Channel  and then into the Hinchinbrook Channel, and to the south by Gentle Annie Creek which flows into the Coral Sea.

The cape Lucinda Point is the north-eastern corner of the locality. The town of Lucinda developed along the east coast from the point and extending south.

The Herbert River flows into the sea in 3 different ways:

 the main outlet goes north into the Seaford Channel and then into the Hinchbrook Channel
 a second lesser outlet goes east into the Enterprise Channel through the locality and then into the Coral Sea
 the small Gentle Annie Creek provides another outflow further south-east into the Coral Sea.

Dungeness takes its name from Dungeness Creek, which, in turn, was named after  headland Dungeness on the coast of Kent, England. Unlike the town of Lucinda, Dungeness faces west onto the Enterprise Channel.

History 

Lucinda is located on the traditional lands of the Biyaygiri people.

The town was named after Lady Lucinda Musgrave, the wife of the Governor of Queensland, Sir Anthony Musgrave from 1883 to 1888, or the Queensland Government steam yacht, the Lucinda, that was in turn named after her.

In 1896, the Colonial Sugar Refining Company built a tramway from its Victoria sugar mill to Lucinda Point where the Queensland Government contracted the Rooney Brothers of Townsville built a storage shed and jetty. The existing harbour at Dungeness was not regarded as viable due to its shifting sandbanks. The current jetty was built in 1979. On Thursday 3 February 2011, the jetty suffered severe wave damage during Tropical Cyclone Yasi, but was repaired. 

Lucinda Post Office opened on 6 October 1896.

Dungeness Provisional School opened in 1896. Due to problems with flooding, the school was moved to Lucinda Point in 1897 and in 1898 renamed as Lucinda Point Provisional School. On 1 January 1909, it became Lucinda Point State School. It was mothballed on 4 November 2008 and closed on 31 December 2008. It was at 20 Patterson Parade (corner Waring Street). The school's website was archived.

Economy 

The jetty can accommodate Panamax-class ships and it takes 22 minutes for the sugar to travel the length of the jetty by conveyor belt. The sugar is supplied from the Victoria and Macnade sugar mills.

Lucinda is also used as a port for a supply barge to Palm Island.

Education 
There are no schools in Lucinda. The nearest government primary school is Halifax State School in neighbouring Halifax to the south. The nearest government secondary school is Ingham State High School in Ingham to the south-west.

Amenities 
Lucinda is serviced by a convenience store, the Hinchinbrook Marine Cove Resort on the waterfront on Dungeness Road, the Wanderers Village Resort on Bruce Parade and a hotel on Lucinda Point Road. It is also frequently serviced by Ingham and the nearby town of Halifax. Lucinda is serviced 5 days a week by Australia Post.

References

External links

 
 
 
 

Towns in Queensland
Coastal towns in Queensland
North Queensland
Shire of Hinchinbrook
Localities in Queensland